Tashan District is a district (bakhsh) in Behbahan County, Khuzestan Province, Iran. At the 2006 census, its population was 13,829, in 2,855 families.  The district has one city Tashan. The district has two rural districts (dehestan): Tashan-e Gharbi Rural District and Tashan-e Sharqi Rural District.

References 

Behbahan County

Districts of Khuzestan Province